Verónica Chen (born 1969) is an Argentine film director, film editor, and screenwriter.

Biography
Verónica Chen was born in Buenos Aires, 1969. She grew up in Texas. She is a graduate of the Centro de Experimentacion y Réalización Cinematográfica.

Filmography 
 Los Inocentes (1994) (short film)
 Qué felicidad (1994) (short film)
 Soldado (1995) (short film)
 Ariel Lavalle (1995) (short film)
 Calor humano (1996) (short film)
 2015 (1996) (short film)
 Ezeiza (1997) (short film)
 Vagón fumador (2001)
 Overblinded (2003)
 Aguas argentinas (2003)
 Ensayo (2003) (TV series)
 Agua (2006)

References

External links

1969 births
Living people
Argentine film directors
Argentine screenwriters
Argentine women writers
Argentine women film directors
Writers from Buenos Aires
Argentine film editors
Women film editors